This is a list of Italian television related events from 1968.

Events 

 The miniseries L'Odissea and La famiglia Benvenuti begin a new trend in the RAI fiction: they are shot in color (although broadcast in black and white) by film directors and with a cinematographic style. However, RAI does not stop producing the traditional “scripted novels” in theatrical style.
 January 15: the broadcast schedule of the National Channel is extended to the lunch time, now covering the time slots from 12:30 AM to 2 PM and from 17 PM to 23.30 PM.
 February 3: the Sanremo Festival, hosted for the first time by Pippo Baudo, is won by Sergio Endrigo and Roberto Carlos with Canzone per te. Endrigo is the first of the cantautori to win first place. The show is marked by the presence of illustrious jazzmen, such as Lionel Hampton and Louis Armstrong. It also includes a controversy between the former friends Adriano Celentano and Don Backy for a copyright question, quarreling in front of the RAI cameras.
August 18: on the magazine Tv7, goes on air I bambini di Bien Hoa (Bien Hoa children), an impressive reportage by Furio Colombo, almost completely without spoken comment, about the American bombing in Vietnam. The program arouses protests and charges of anti-Americanism; the director of the RAI news Fabiano Fabiani is forced to resign.
October 1: the Swiss television begins color broadcasting, in time for the Mexico Olympic Games. Soon, many Italian viewers prefer the Italian Swiss channel (TSI), in color and not politically conditioned, to RAI.

Debuts

Variety 

 La corrida – Dilettanti allo sbaraglio (The corrida – Amateurs at risk). Talent-show, hosted by Corrado Maltoni; born for the radio in 1968 and successfully transposed in TV in the Eighties. Unlike the following talent-show, here the competitors are true amateurs, often good-willing but comically inept, and politely mocked by the host.
 Oggi le comiche (Today slapstick) – Anthology, hosted by Renzo Palmer, of comic shorts from the golden age of silent film.
 Senza rete (Without a net) – Musical show of the summer; lasted for 8 seasons, with various hosts. So called because the singers perform “without the net” of the play-back, it gets, in some years, up 18 million viewers.

Serials 

 La famiglia Benvenuti (The Benvenuti family) – by Alfredo Giannetti, with Enrico Maria Salerno, Valeria Valeri and Claudio Gora. This family comedy about the life of a middle-class family (an architect, his wife and his two sons) is, by now, a precious time capsule about the Italian way of life in the late Sixties. It gets a great success by public and critic and, in 1969, a second season in colors is shot. Later, it's no more replied, because the child star Giusva Fioravanti (who played the role of the younger son) is become a NAR terrorist. 
 I ragazzi di padre Tobia (Father Tobia's children) by Mario Casacci and Alberto Ciambricco. It's a serial for kid about the adventures of a boy-scout band and their spiritual leader, the unconventional parson Father Tobia (Silvano Tranquilli).

Television shows

Dramas 

 Il caso Chessman (The Chessman affair) – by Giuseppe Fina
 Addio giovinezza (Farewell youth!) – by Antonello Falqui, with Nino Castelnuovo and the singer Gigliola Cinquetti, from the Camasio and Oxilia’s play about the love affairs of two undergraduates.

Miniseries

Period drama 
 L’affare Dreyfus (The Dreyfus affair) – by Leandro Castellani, with Gianni Santuccio as Emile Zola.
 Il circolo Pickwick (The Pickwick papers) – by Ugo Gregoretti, with Raffaele Pisu as Pickwick, Enzo Cerusico as Samuel Weller and Gigi Proietti as Jingle. Breaking with the traditional seriousness of the Italian period dramas, the director transposes the Dickens’ novel in a light-hearted and experimental style, sometimes also appearing onscreen, in modern dresses, to chat with the characters.
 La freccia nera (The black arrow) – by Anton Giulio Majano, with Aldo Reggiani, Loretta Goggi (in her first adult role) and Arnoldo Foà, from the Stevenson’s novel. It was one of the show most loved by the youngest ones and the title track by Riz Ortolani became a hit.
 Le mie prigioni (My prisons) – by Sandro Bolchi, with Raoul Grassilli and Arnoldo Foà, from the autobiographical book of Silvio Pellico.
 Non cantare, spara (Shot, don’t sing) – by Daniele D’Anza, with the Quartetto Cetra. Musical parody of the western movies, it was a clamorous flop, notwithstanding its stellar cast.
 L’Odissea (Odissey) – by Franco Rossi, with Bekim Fehmiu as Odysseus and Irene Papas as Penelope. It was the first great coproduction among European televisions (Italy, France, Deutschland and Yugoslavia), of a spectacular value never got before on the little screen. Shot in color, it was seen in black and white by the Italian viewers; notwithstanding, it was the hit of the year for public and critic The 80 years old poet Giuseppe Ungaretti introduced every episode reading his Homer’s’ translation.

Mystery 
 Sherlock Holmes – by Guglielmo Morandi, with Nando Gazzolo in the title role , from The valley of fear and The hound of the Baskervilles.
La donna di quadri (The queen of diamonds) – mystery by Leonardo Cortese, with Ubaldo Lay as the police lieutenant Sheridan. It's the second chapter of the “cycle of the queens” (of the playing cards). As in the others Sheridan's inquiries, the story is set in a fictive America, fully reconstructed in studio (but the final chapter is set in Capri).
I racconti del maresciallo (The marshal's tales) – by Mario Landi, from the stories of Mario Soldati (who appears onscreen, introducing every episode). Turi Ferro plays magisterially a Carabinier's Marshasl, zealous at work but very human; his stories are, more than detective tales, sketches about the Italian province life.

Variety

 Canzonissima 1968 (Supersong 1968) – hosted by Mina, Walter Chiari and Paolo Panelli. The winner of the traditional musical competition of the winter is Gianni Morandi, with Scende la pioggia (The rain goes on, cover of Eleonore by the Turtles).
 Che domenica amici (What a Sunday, my friends!) – hosted by Raffaele Pisu and the duo Ric e Gian.
 Quelli della domenica (The Sunday people) – comic variety, broadcast the Sunday afternoon. It revealed to a large public the duo Cochi e Renato and moreover the disturbing and grotesque humor by Paolo Villaggio. The Genoese comic created, for the show, two of his most famous characters: the professor Otto von Kranz, a German illusionist, arrogant and muddler, and Giandomenico Fracchia, a pusillanimous clerk oppressed by his superiors.
 Delia Scala story – tribute show to the famous soubrette.
 Su e giù (Up and down) – quiz, hosted by Corrado Maltoni.
 Vengo anch’io (I come too) – hosted by Raffaele Pisu.

Educational 

 Appunti per un film sull’India (Notes for a movie about India) – by Pier Paolo Pasolini. The writer-director, in spite of his very fierce critics on TV and mass-culture, accepts to realize for RAI a documentary about  “hunger and religion in the Third world”. In the same year, he meets Ezra Pound for the TV magazine Incontri.
 Questa nostra Italia (This our Italy) – by Guido Piovene and Virgilio Sabel. Piovene repeats, for the television, the tour of Italy already performed in 1955 for the radio.

Ending this year 

 Almanacco
 Non è mi troppo tardi

See also 

 List of Italian films of 1968

References